Danzhai Wanda Village is a tourism town. It was built as part of Wanda Group's poverty alleviation program in Danzhai County, Guizhou Province.

Background 
Danzhai is one of China's most ethnically diverse regions, located in the province of Guizhou in Southwestern China. With a population of approximately 172,000, it sits administratively under the Qiandongnan Miao and Dong Autonomous Prefecture. The region is known for its geographic, cultural and ethnic diversity, including the rice terraces, and Miao ethnic crafts and traditions.

History 
In 2014, the Wanda Group designated it as the site for its ‘Enterprise Sponsored County-wide Comprehensive Poverty Alleviation’ program. The Wanda Group has committed to invest 300 million yuan to a Danzhai vocational school, 500 million yuan for a Danzhai poverty alleviation fund, and 700 million yuan for a Danzhai Wanda Village, which includes a hotel and a town district built in the Miao architectural tradition.

In July 2017, the village celebrated its grand opening. Wanda is planning to build more tourism villages for poverty alleviation.

Rotating Mayors

The village has had a series of "rotating mayors" who help to promote it. One was Matt William Knowles.

In popular culture

The village features in the short story "Monster" by Naomi Kritzer, a finalist for a 2021 Hugo Award.

References

Geography of Guizhou
Dalian Wanda Group